Sami Abdulghani  (born 1 June 1989) is a Saudi professional footballer who plays as a midfielder and left back.

References

1989 births
Living people
Saudi Arabian footballers
Ittihad FC players
Al-Wehda Club (Mecca) players
Al-Riyadh SC players
Al-Orobah FC players
Al-Fayha FC players
Hajer FC players
Al Jeel Club players
Place of birth missing (living people)
Saudi First Division League players
Saudi Professional League players
Association football midfielders